William Gordon (December 15, 1862 – January 16, 1942) was a lawyer, politician, businessman, and three-term U.S. Representative from Ohio from 1913 to 1919.

Biography
Gordon was born on a farm near Oak Harbor in Ottawa County, Ohio. He attended the public schools and Toledo (Ohio) Business College and then taught school. Entering politics, he was the deputy county treasurer from 1887 to 1889 and a member of the board of school examiners of Ottawa County 1890–1896.

He graduated from the law department of the University of Michigan at Ann Arbor in 1893. Gordon was admitted to the bar the same year and commenced practice in Oak Harbor. He was the prosecuting attorney for Ottawa County from 1895 to 1901 and a delegate to the Democratic National Convention in 1896. He was a member of the Democratic State committee in 1903 and 1904.

Congress 
Entering private business, he founded the Gordon Lumber Company. In 1906, he moved to Cleveland, Ohio, and reentered politics shortly afterward. Gordon was an unsuccessful candidate for election in 1910 to the Sixty-second Congress but was elected as a Democrat to the Sixty-third, Sixty-fourth, and Sixty-fifth Congresses (March 4, 1913 – March 3, 1919). He was an unsuccessful candidate for reelection in 1918 to the Sixty-sixth Congress. Washington Gordon founded The Gordon Lumber Company.

Private life 
Gordon reengaged in the practice of law until his death in Cleveland in 1942. He was interred in Oak Harbor Cemetery, Oak Harbor, Ohio.

Gordon was married September 12, 1893 to Elizabeth Gernhard, daughter of the sheriff of Ottawa County. They had two children.

Gordon was Knights Templar. He resigned from the Knights Templar in the late 1920s over their anti-Catholic stance versus Democratic Presidential candidate Al Smith.

References

Notes

1862 births
1942 deaths
People from Oak Harbor, Ohio
Politicians from Cleveland
Ohio lawyers
Democratic Party members of the United States House of Representatives from Ohio
University of Michigan Law School alumni
County district attorneys in Ohio